Darreh Shahr County is in Ilam province, Iran. The capital of the county is the city of Darreh Shahr. At the 2006 census, the county's population was 56,346 in 11,487 households. The following census in 2011 counted 59,551 people in 14,867 households. At the 2016 census, the county's population was 43,708 in 12,012 households, by which time Badreh District had been separated from the county to form Badreh County.

Administrative divisions

The population history and structural changes of Darreh Shahr County's administrative divisions over three consecutive censuses are shown in the following table. The latest census shows two districts, four rural districts, and two cities.

Abdanan County and Badreh County used to be districts of Darreh Shahr County before 1995 and 2013, respectively, after which they were upgraded to county status themselves.

Neighboring counties

Abdanan – south
Badreh – northwest
Rumeshkhan County, Lorestan – north
Pol-e Dokhtar County, Lorestan – east

Geography 
Darreh Shahr is bounded by Kabir Kuh range to the south and Seymareh and Karkheh rivers to the north. The plains between the mountains and the rivers are fertile farmlands being cultivated for millennia. The Kabir Kouh Protected Area is the most important conservation area in the county.

Rivers

 Seymareh River
 Karkheh River
 Darreh Shahr River
 Sikan River

Lakes

 Seymareh Dam Lake

Climate 
Darreh Shahr County has a warm climate with hot dry summers and mild wet winters. July–August maximum daily temperature can as high as  during heat waves, which are frequent in summer due to proximity to the Iraqi desert. Winters are generally mild but occasionally goes below freezing.

The highest annual precipitation used to be  in 1990–1991, after which, a deadly flood ensued.

There is almost no precipitation through the months of June to September. Darreh Shahr used to receive snow once or twice a year in the past, but nowadays it has become less and less likely thanks to global warming. Hail and lightning storms are not uncommon in Fall and Spring and have devastating effects on crops and the farming-dependent economy of the county.

Western air masses from the Mediterranean and Black Sea are cause autumn and winter rains in the province, and Sudanese and Red Sea and Saudi Arabia currents are also effective in winter and spring rains and cause warm weather in summer. The vast plains of Iraq create a low-pressure high-temperature low-humidity weather cell over the area.

Seymareh Landslide 
In prehistoric times, a huge landslide occurred in the south eastern parts of Kabir Kuh range. The incident is described in an article on Royal Geographical Society, published in 1937 by Harrison and Falcon. The reason for this colossal event is very likely to have been a catastrophic earthquake. Due to its enormity, the Seymareh Landslide is believed to be the largest one recorded in the eastern hemisphere.

Economy
The economy of Darreh Shahr is mostly based on agriculture and animal husbandry. As of February 2018, Darreh Shahr farmers produce more than 190,000 tons of agricultural and 23,000 tons of livestock products annually. The agriculture market in Darreh Shahr is worth around US$17.7m. 

The majority of the people living in urban areas, especially Darreh Shahr, work in construction and services trades sector. As the county seat, Darreh Shahr hosts almost all of the government offices of the county, therefore many people work for the government.

Despite the rather solid agriculture sector, the industry sector is emerging and small. Darreh Shahr Industrial City hosts a number of SMEs, the most prominent of which are Seif Ghostar Food Products Company and Madakto Steel Cord Company, the first and only steel cord producer in Iran. Darreh Shahr Flour Factory, established in 1993, is a wheat flour milling plant with an installed capacity of 120 metric tons per day. The factory mainly serves the domestic and local markets with limited exports to Iraq in recent years.

Tourism
Darreh Shahr County received more than 400,000 visitors in 2018, 120,000 of which visited the county in Spring alone. Darreh Shahr is the most visited county in Ilam Province. Darreh Shahr is home to 145 nationally registered monuments, buildings and historical sites. Darreh Shahr is built next to the ancient city of Madaktu, an important city in Elam civilization. The city has been destructed and reconstructed several times in history, each time changing name. Darreh Shahr county has been a popular settlement area throughout history because of the abundance of nearby natural resources, specifically the proximity of Kabir Kouh range as a source of water, fertile soil, woodlands and wildlife.

Darreh Shahr Fire Temple is a four-arched building which is locally called Taaq. Originally the building was constructed by rubble stone and gypsum, and has recently been repaired.

Gavmishan Bridge is located in the south of Darreh Shahr, in the beginning of a gorge with the same name on the outskirts of Kabir Kuh, is an ancient bridge with three arches that has been recently repaired (as of 2008). Each of its arches is placed at  intervals from each other. This Sassanide bridge has been constructed in the confluence of the Seymareh and Kashkan rivers. Although it has been repaired several times during the past, it is almost in a ruined state now.

Sheikh Makan Fort is located 6 kilometers southeast of Darreh Shahr, the ruins of this fort can be seen in the entrance of the village with the same name with 150 years of antiquity. Construction materials indicate that it belongs to the Qajar period. The walls of the fort are delicately made of stone and gypsum. There is also the remains of a watermill.

There are many crevices and caves. One of them is known as the Kulkani Cave. The entrance of the cave is 30 meters long and there is a small pond built of stone and Sarouj (plaster of lime and ash or sand). In addition, there are 12 other caves similar to the dwellings of pre-historic men. Some vestiges like earthenware pieces and other objects belonging to the mid 1st millennium BC have been discovered in this cave.

Jaber Mausoleum which resembles the Tomb of Daniel in Susa with a northern entrance is 15 m long and 9 m wide with 8 pillars. There is an adytum in its southern wall which is 180 cm high. At the lower part there is an inscription with plaster work and adorned with floral design and sacred verses. This mausoleum is one of the important places of pilgrimage in Darreh Shahr.

Baba Seifedin Mausoleum in located in the north east of Darreh Shahr in the outskirts of a hill known as Chahar Taq. There are two tombs in the mausoleum without any description on the tombstones. There is a small inscription on the top of the entrance door which indicates the date of its repair. The materials of the building are stone, gypsum and brick. There are several trees around the mausoleum which are hundreds of years old.

Tikhan (Tiqan) is located among the agricultural lands in Jamshid Abad village north east of Darreh Shahr. In excavations carried out in its location, 4 levels have been appeared. The earthenware objects obtained in the first floor are simple. Moreover, some flint blades and carved stones have been discovered there as well.

Koozeh Garan Hill is about 5.5 kilometers from Tikhan Hill, and is larger and older than it. Its antiquity dates back to the late 3rd millennium BC., but its first floor relates to the Sassanide period. Some colored and engraved earthenware objects have been discovered in the basement of the building. Certain parts of lower floors had been allocated as a graveyard. The upper graves belong to the Zoroastrian period. It is said that this place was a pottery making vicinity so to speak.

Cham Namesht Bridge is an 18-arch bridge constructed on the Seymareh river 4 kilometers north of Darreh Shahr facing the Chamkalan village. The antiquity of this bridge dates back to the Sassanide period, but it was used till later centuries. The bridge is directly connected to the remains of the Sassanide monuments in Darreh Shahr.

Bahram-e Choobin Gorge, a narrow and high valley, is one of the most important and strategic points of the region, located in the western side of the Darreh Shahr - Pol Dokhtar road. This gorge, which is also called the Bahram Hunting Ground, contains several historical monuments in its entrance and on the hard rocks like the ruins of a Sassanide castle which is built of stone and gypsum with stone stairs and four connected water reservoirs (Ab Anbar) which are worth seeing.

Imamzadeh Saleh is located in Majeen Graveyard near Darreh Shahr. This quadrangular and two-story building has a pyramid shaped dome. The main tomb is located in the first floor which is totally made up of brick with a herringbone arch. In the second floor, there is a tomb covered with stone, gypsum and earthenware. Its antiquity dates back to the 8th century AH. and needs some repair. Interior plaster works of the Imamzadeh are unique and counted as worthy vestiges of this period.

Gallery

References

External links
Iran Tourism and Touring Online ( Darreh Shahr Ancient City)
 اطلس گیتاشناسی استان‌های ایران [Atlas Gitashenasi Ostanhai Iran] (Gitashenasi Province Atlas of Iran)

 

Counties of Ilam Province